Man & Woman is an album by American jazz guitarist George Freeman recorded in 1974 and released on the Groove Merchant label.

Reception 

Allmusic's Jason Ankeny said: "While Man & Woman embraces a mellower approach than guitarist George Freeman's other Groove Merchant dates, it's by no means the late-night boudoir record its erotic cover suggests – the stripped-down, nuanced sound instead adheres to a relatively straightforward soul-jazz formula, more focused and earthbound in its orientation than the average Freeman session. ... the guitarist embraces the change of pace, settling comfortably into the music's slow, slinky grooves – not only are his solos as imaginative as before, but they also boast a rippling sensuality otherwise absent from his previous records".

Track listing
 "Till There Was You" (Meredith Willson) – 5:07
 "You've Changed" (Carl Fischer, Bill Carey) – 5:53
 "I Ain't Got Nobody" (Spencer Williams, Roger Graham) – 4:31
 "Groovy Lady" (George Freeman) – 4:49
 "Funny How Time Slips Away" (Willie Nelson) – 5:08
 "Squeeze Me" (Fats Waller, Clarence Williams) – 6:04
 "Stardust" (Hoagy Carmichael, Mitchell Parish) – 4:00
 "Georgia on My Mind" (Carmichael, Stuart Gorrell) – 6:07

Personnel
George Freeman – guitar
Harold Mabern Jr. − piano, electric piano
Kenny Barron − electric piano
Bobby Cranshaw – bass
Buddy Williams (tracks 1–5 & 7), Bernard Trapps (tracks 6 & 8) – drums

References

Groove Merchant albums
George Freeman (guitarist) albums
1974 albums
Albums produced by Sonny Lester